Juma Luzio  (born 24 November 1997) is a Tanzanian football striker who plays for Mtibwa Sugar F.C.

Career

References

External links
Juma Luzio at www.goal.com

1997 births
Living people
Tanzanian footballers
Tanzania international footballers
Association football forwards
Mtibwa Sugar F.C. players
ZESCO United F.C. players
Simba S.C. players
Tanzanian Premier League players